Dudleya brittonii, with the common names Britton's dudleya, Britton's liveforever and giant chalk dudleya, is a succulent plant in the family Crassulaceae. It is native to the coast of northern Baja California, Mexico. Both forms of the plant have yellow leaves on a clustered rosette atop a large reddish-purple peduncle. The white form of the plant has a chalky epicuticular wax that reflects light and reacts with water. The green form of the plant is more common and found throughout a wider range. It is among the largest of the Dudleya.

Description
Dudleya brittonii has a short, stout caudex, often covered in dry leaves. Rosettes often grow solitarily out of the caudex. Basal leaves are numerous and erect. Younger leaves are linear-lanceolate, older leaves are oblong-lanceolate and much more wide and turgid at the base. Leaves are 7 to 11 cm long, and older leaves are 4.5 to 5.5 cm wide at the base. Leaves are flat above the middle but convex on both sides below, with a submedian keel on the upper surface, apiculate to acuminate, often with a red subulate tip. With age, leaves turn reddish-heliotrope.

The flowering stem arises from the basal leaves, thin, erect, and reddish-purple. Bracts are horizontal, very thin, long-lanceolate, half encircle the stem, acuminate, light green or red, and prone to withering quickly after flowering.

The inflorescence is cymose, about 10 cm across but narrow laterally, with vivid red branchlets holding erect, slender pedicels 7 to 9 cm long.

The flower has a bright green calyx about 5 mm long, with acute, long-lanceolate segments. The corolla is erect, with a length of about 9 mm, cleft two-thirds to the base, composed of linear-lanceolate segments. The petals are hyaline to pale white, with the keel imbued in yellow.

The leaves of the glaucous form of Dudleya brittonii are covered with a dusty, chalky, mealy white epicuticular wax.  The wax in its mealy state on the leaves is attracted to water and coats drops on the leaves and prevents their evaporation. The wax has the highest measured ultraviolet reflectivity of any plant.

Dudleya brittonii is similar in appearance to D. pulverulenta, which shares an overlapping distribution, and D. ingens, which only occurs further south.

Taxonomy 
Dudleya brittonii was discovered by a Mr. Howard E. Gates at the mouth of a canyon north of the 32nd parallel, supposedly "midway between Descanso and Ensenada." D. brittonii was described by Donald A. Johansen in 1933, in the fourth volume of the Cactus & Succulent Journal of America.

It is named after Nathaniel Lord Britton, one of the botanists who first described the genus Dudleya.

Green form 

The green form of D. brittonii is regarded by some authors as a separate species, described as Dudleya viridis P.H. Thomson

There are several differences in the morphology of D. brittonii and D. viridis

 The foliage of D. viridis has a distinctive apple-green, golden-green, to a bright dark green coloration. D. brittonii has a white coloration.
 D. viridis has pendant flower heads, recurved bracts, and cream yellow, dark yellow or white flowers. D. brittonii has upright flower heads, horizontal bracts and pale yellow or white flowers.
 D. viridis has as few as 40 leaves in young plants and as many as 190 leaves in old plants, the most in the Dudleya genus.
 D. viridis will curve into a "ball" shape when it is dormant.
Furthermore, the flowering time between the green form and the glaucous form is very divergent, with the green form flowering up to six weeks or more later when cohabiting with the glaucous form. Researchers who have spent many years studying Dudleya brittonii, like Thomas W. Mulroy, agree with the conclusion that both forms deserve proper taxonomic recognition.

Distribution and habitat 
Dudleya brittonii occurs from extreme northwest Baja California from La Misión south to the vicinity of Eréndira and on the island of Todos Santos. The glaucous, white form inhabits the bluff faces and steep slopes, whilst the green form inhabits rocky areas away from bluffs and the flat slopes of talus and soil below bluffs. Development along the Baja California coast is imperiling the species.

Cultivation
Dudleya brittonii is cultivated as an ornamental plant for use in well-drained rock gardens and as a potted succulent.

It has gained the Royal Horticultural Society's Award of Garden Merit. In temperate climates it is normally grown under glass in cactus compost. However it can be placed outdoors in a sheltered, sunny spot during the summer months.

See also 

 Dudleya candida
 Dudleya pulverulenta
 Dudleya ingens

References

External links

brittonii
Flora of Baja California
Endemic flora of Mexico
Natural history of the California chaparral and woodlands
Garden plants of North America
Drought-tolerant plants